Udaipur city may refer to:
 Udaipur, a major city in Rajasthan
 Udaipur City railway station
 Udaipur City Bus Depot

See also 
 Udaipur (disambiguation)